The Way I Should is the third album released by singer-songwriter Iris DeMent. It peaked at number 22 on the Billboard Heatseekers chart.

Guests include guitarist Mark Knopfler and Delbert McClinton, who duets with DeMent on "Trouble".

The album was nominated for the Grammy Award for Best Contemporary Folk Album at the 40th Annual Grammy Awards.

Track listing

Personnel
Iris DeMent – vocals, guitar, piano
Mark Knopfler – National guitar (track 6) 
Chuck Leavell – organ, piano, accordion
Lonnie Mack – electric guitar (track 11)
Brent Mason – electric guitar solo (track 5)
Paul Franklin – steel guitar
John Jennings – guitar, EBow, 6-string bass
Bekka Bramlett – background vocals (track 3)
Billy Burnette – background vocals (track 3)
Melodie Crittenden – background vocals (tracks 6, 9)
Delbert McClinton – harmonica, vocals (track 11)
Dave Pomeroy – bass
Tom Roady – tambourine
Tammy Rogers – fiddle, mandolin, violin, cello, viola
Harry Stinson – drums
Russ Taff – background vocals (track 3)
Earl Scruggs – banjo (track 9)
Randy Scruggs – guitar
Stuart Smith – guitar, slide guitar

Production notes
Produced by Randy Scruggs
Engineered and mixed by Chuck Ainlay
Mastered by Denny Purcell
Assistant Engineers – Chris Rua and Graham Lewis
Photography by Debbie Spinelli and Rocky Schenck
Art direction and design by Stephen Walker and Terry Robertson

References

1993 albums
Iris DeMent albums
Warner Records albums